Ethan Allen Andrews may refer to:

 Ethan Allen Andrews (lexicographer) (1787–1858), American educator and lexicographer
 Ethan Allen Andrews (biologist) (1859–1956), American biologist